Lorane is an unincorporated community in Bibb County, in the U.S. state of Georgia.

History
A post office called Lorane was established in 1885, and remained in operation until 1940. The community's original name was "Lorraine"; a railroad error accounts for the error in spelling, which was never corrected.

References

Unincorporated communities in Bibb County, Georgia